

Humbertus was a medieval Bishop of Elmham.

Humbertus was consecrated before 824. Medieval hagiographies of Edmund the Martyr say that Humbertus crowned the young Edmund at Burna on Christmas Day 856. 

He was martyred by the Danes. His date of death is uncertain; he may have died possibly in November 869.

After Humbertus, there was an interruption with the episcopal succession through the Danish Viking invasions in the late 9th and early 10th centuries. By the mid-10th century, the sees Elmham and Dunwich had been united under Bishop Eadwulf.

Notes

References

External links
 

Bishops of Elmham
English Roman Catholic saints
9th-century Christian saints
870 deaths
East Anglian saints
Year of birth unknown

la:Humbertus
nl:Humbertus